Modern tango music (or contemporary tango) includes several different types of tango.

It includes nuevo tango, the music of Astor Piazzolla, Osvaldo Pugliese, Horacio Salgán and others. They are the composers who altered the idea of tango during and after the 1950s.
Neotango, sometimes referred to as electrotango, is the tango revival music from the 1990s and early 21st century that renewed an interest in tango music and dancing. It includes bands such as Gotan Project, Bajofondo, Otros Aires, Narcotango and others.
Contemporary acoustic tango is not really a genre. But, there are contemporary acoustic tango groups with original compositions and orchestration, such as Juan Carlos Cáceres, Hugo Diaz, and Ruben Rada.

Dance music genres
Tango
Latin music genres